Fredrik Ekblom (born 6 October 1970) is a Swedish race car driver from Kumla. After an early career in single-seaters he switched to touring car racing where he won multiple titles in his native Swedish Touring Car Championship and later in the TTA – Racing Elite League.

Career

CART
He made 13 Indy Lights starts in 1992 and 1993. He then made three starts in CART for three different teams and was entered in the 1994 and 1995 Indianapolis 500 races, but after passing rookie orientation in 1994, he never appeared for practice either year.

24 Hours of Le Mans
In 1997 and 1998 he drove in the 24 Hours of Le Mans for Courage Compétition and in 1999 for Nissan Motorsports.

Swedish Touring Car Championship
He began racing in the Swedish Touring Car Championship where he was the series champion in 1998 in a WestCoast Racing prepared BMW 320i. After two seasons away from the championship he went on to be champion twice more, winning his second title on his return to the series in 2003 with a Kristoffersson Motorsport–run Audi A4. He continued to drive in the series for Audi until 2006 before returning to WestCoast Racing in 2007 where he became champion for the third time. He stayed with the team for the following season where he finished runner–up to Richard Göransson. In 2009 Swedish Touring Car Championship season he moved to the E.ON Biogas Racing Team, driving a Volkswagen Scirocco which ran on bio–gas.

European Touring Car Championship
During his time away from the Swedish Touring Car Championship, Ekblom competed in the American Le Mans Series and then the European Touring Car Championship in 2002. He drove a BMW 320i for BMW Team Belgium He finished 6th in the championship with a trio of third–place finishes as his best results.

World Touring Car Championship
He competed in some rounds of the 2007 World Touring Car Championship season for BMW Team UK to help Andy Priaulx with his title campaign. He made his first appearance at the Race of Sweden before returning for the final two rounds of the season, he scored a single point at the final race in Macau.

Ekblom drove a Volvo S60 in seven rounds of the 2016 World Touring Car Championship for Polestar Cyan Racing, with a best result of fourth at Hungary race 1.

TTA / STCC
Ekblom signed a three-year deal with Volvo Polestar Racing to compete in the TTA – Racing Elite League starting in 2012. Ekblom secured third on grid at the final round in Gothenburg to claim the drivers' championship title. He finished fifth in the 2013 STCC – Racing Elite League. Despite missing two races, he came third in the 2014. The driver was runner-up in 2015, also with a Polestar Volvo S60.

After skipping the 2016 season, Ekblom joined Kristoffersson Motorsport to compete at the 2017 TCR Scandinavia Touring Car Championship with a dealer-supported Volkswagen Golf GTI.

Racing record

American Open Wheel
(key)

CART

24 Hours of Le Mans results

Complete Swedish Touring Car Championship results
(key) (Races in bold indicate pole position) (Races in italics indicate fastest lap)

Complete European Touring Car Championship results
(key) (Races in bold indicate pole position) (Races in italics indicate fastest lap)

Complete World Touring Car Championship results
(key) (Races in bold indicate pole position) (Races in italics indicate fastest lap)

Complete Scandinavian Touring Car Championship results
(key) (Races in bold indicate pole position) (Races in italics indicate fastest lap)

Complete TTA–Racing Elite League results
(key) (Races in bold indicate pole position) (Races in italics indicate fastest lap)

References

1970 births
Swedish racing drivers
Swedish Touring Car Championship drivers
World Touring Car Championship drivers
Champ Car drivers
Indy Lights drivers
British Formula 3000 Championship drivers
Swedish Formula Three Championship drivers
24 Hours of Le Mans drivers
Living people
European Touring Car Championship drivers
People from Kumla Municipality
Sportspeople from Örebro County
Nismo drivers
Walker Racing drivers
A. J. Foyt Enterprises drivers
BMW M drivers
Racing Bart Mampaey drivers
Schnitzer Motorsport drivers
Fortec Motorsport drivers
Nürburgring 24 Hours drivers
Porsche Motorsports drivers
Volkswagen Motorsport drivers